In Islam, Barakah or Baraka ( "blessing") is a blessing power, a kind of continuity of spiritual presence and revelation that begins with God and flows through that and those closest to God.

Baraka can be found within physical objects, places, and people, as chosen by God. This force begins by flowing directly from God into creation that is worthy of baraka. These creations endowed with baraka can then transmit the flow of baraka to the other creations of God through physical proximity or through the adherence to the spiritual practices of the Islamic prophet Muhammad. God is the sole source of baraka and has the power to grant and withhold baraka.

Islamic mysticism
Baraka is a prominent concept in Islamic mysticism, particularly Sufism. It pervades Sufi texts, beliefs, practices, and spirituality. Sufism emphasizes the importance of esoteric knowledge and the spiritual union with God through the heart. Baraka symbolizes this connection between the divine and the worldly through God's direct and intentional blessing of those that are most reflective of Him and his teachings.

Baraka is not a state, it is a flow of blessings and grace. It flows from God to those that are closest to God, such as saints and prophets. Those that have received baraka are thought to have the abilities to perform miracles (karamat), such as thought-reading, healing the sick, flying, and reviving the dead. However, according to Abd al-Karīm ibn Hawāzin Qushayri, a prominent Sufi mystic, the use of these miracles and the actual possession of these abilities are not indicative of a saint's status, however, the performance of these miracles by prophets is important to establish credentials.

Sources, transmission, and traditional importance
The ultimate source for barakah is God. Allah bestows blessings and barakah upon who he wills and what he wills and is not limited in any aspect.

Transmission through Sunnah
By following the practices and teachings of Muhammad, one can achieve baraka through the emulation of Sunnah. Because Muhammad is the source of Muhammadan baraka, by living in constant remembrance of the names of God and in accordance to Muhammad's Sunnah. Those that live the inner Sunnah within the heart, are those that reflect the Light of Muhammad (al-nur al-muhammadi) and the Muhammadan baraka. Those that live according to the Sunnah, live in constant remembrance of God, and live authentically from the heart are those to whom God opens the channel through which baraka can flow. By living in accordance to Muhammad, one can become worthy of God's direct blessing of baraka. If granted baraka, the saintly person is able to feel God's force from within and is nourished by the hadith while being guided by the baraka.

See also
 Al-Barakah
 Basirah
 Spiritual gift
 Glossary of Islam
 The White Days
 Brakha (daily prayer in Mandaeism)

References

Works cited

General references
 Coulon, C., et al. (1988). Charisma and Brotherhood in African Islam. Oxford University Press. .
 Meri, J.W. (1999) Aspects of Baraka (Blessings) and Ritual Devotion among Medieval Muslims and Jews. Medieval Encounters. 5, pp. 46–69.
 Takim, L. N. (2006). The Heirs of the Prophet: Charisma And Religious Authority in Shi'ite Islam. SUNY Press. .
 Werbner, P., et al. (1998). Embodying Charisma: Modernity, Locality and Performance of Emotion in Sufi Cults. Routledge. .

Sufism
Energy (esotericism)
Esotericism
Islamic terminology
Islamic practices
Spiritual gifts
Spirituality
Vitalism